Elwood Lewis Richie (August 23, 1883 in Ambler, Pennsylvania – August 15, 1936 in South Mountain, Pennsylvania), was a professional baseball player who played pitcher in the Major Leagues from 1906 to 1913. He would play for the Chicago Cubs, Boston Doves and Philadelphia Phillies.

Richie had signed to play for the Tri-State League's Williamsport team in 1906. The Tri-State League was an "outlaw league" whose contracts were not respected by Major League Baseball, and Richie jumped his 1906 Williamsport contract to sign with the Phillies.

Richie was a gifted musician and minstrel show performer during his playing career. Minstrel entertainer George "Honey Boy" Evans practiced with the Phillies in spring training in 1908. Richie brought his instruments to Savannah, Georgia where the team trained, and he and Evans organized the other players into a minstrel troupe for evening entertainment.

External links

References

1883 births
1936 deaths
People from Ambler, Pennsylvania
Major League Baseball pitchers
Baseball players from Pennsylvania
Chicago Cubs players
Boston Doves players
Philadelphia Phillies players
Kansas City Blues (baseball) players
Sioux City Indians players